The Atlas van Loon was commissioned by Frederik Willem van Loon of Amsterdam. It consists of a large number of maps published between 1649 and 1676:
 Volumes I to IX: The Dutch edition of  Joan Blaeu's Atlas Maior (Grooten Atlas) of 1663-1665
 Volumes X, XI and XII: Blaeu's city books of Italy, covering the Papal States, Rome, Naples, and Sicily, all of 1663.
 Volumes XIII and XIV: Two volumes of the French edition of Blaeu's Atlas Maior, covering France and Switzerland, both of 1663.
 Volumes XV and XVI: Blaeu's Toonneel der Steeden, city books covering both the Northern and the Southern Netherlands, of 1649
 Volume XVII: Pieter Goos's Zee-atlas ofte water-wereld (Maritime Atlas or Water World) of 1676
 Volume XVIII: The French edition of Johannes Janssonius's Zeeatlas (Maritime Atlas) of 1657

The Atlas van Loon was acquired by the Nederlands Scheepvaartmuseum in 1996.

See also

 History of cartography
 Cartography
 Ancient maps
 Willem Blaeu

References

External links

 Digitalized maps and pictures from the Atlas Van Loon:
 Volume I: Atlas Maior I - Northern and Eastern Europe
 Volume II: Atlas Maior II - Germany and Central Europe
 Volume III: Atlas Maior III - the Low Countries
 Volume IV: Atlas Maior IV - England and Wales
 Volume V: Atlas Maior V - Scotland and Ireland
 Volume VI: Atlas Maior VI - France
 Volume VII: Atlas Maior VII - Italy and Greece
 Volume VIII: Atlas Maior VIII - Spain, Portugal, Africa and America
 Volume IX: Atlas Maior IX - Asia
 Volume X: Italian Cities I - the Papal State
 Volume XI: Italian Cities II - Rome
 Volume XII: Italian Cities III - Naples and Sicily
 Volume XIII: French edition Atlas Maior VII - France
 Volume XIV: French edition Atlas Maior VIII - France and Switzerland
 Volume XV: Tooneel der Steeden I - cities and fortifications of the Dutch Republic
 Volume XVI: Tooneel der Steeden II - cities and fortifications of the Spanish Netherlands
 Volume XVII: Goos' Zee-atlas ofte water-wereld
 Volume XVIII:  Janssonius' Zeeatlas

Atlases
1665 books
17th-century Dutch books
Cartography in the Dutch Republic

es:Atlas van Loon#top